Vertigo is the second studio album by the British electronic music duo Groove Armada, released in 1999 on the Jive Electro record label. It contains the well-known singles "At the River" (which was previously featured on the duo's debut album Northern Star) and "I See You Baby".

Release 

"I See You Baby" has been used in advertisements for the Ford Fiesta and the Renault Mégane, the latter of which caused a number of complaints due to the song's lyrical content.

Track listing

Charts

Sales and certifications

References

External links 

 

1999 albums
Groove Armada albums